Quiver were a British rock band formed in 1970 by Tim Renwick and Cal Batchelor. In December 1972, they teamed up with the Sutherland Brothers and became known as Sutherland Brothers & Quiver, releasing soft rock music and achieving success with the songs "(I Don't Want to Love You But) You Got Me Anyway" and "Arms of Mary", a No. 5 UK hit.

Discography

Albums
Quiver (1971), Warner Bros.
Gone in the Morning (1972), Warner Bros.

As Sutherland Brothers & Quiver

Compilation albums
Sailing (1976), Island
The Best of the Sutherland Brothers & Quiver (1976), Island
The Very Best of the Sutherland Brothers & Quiver (2002), Columbia
The Albums (8 CD box set) (2019), Lemon Recordings

Singles
"Green Tree" (1972), Warner Bros.

As Sutherland Brothers & Quiver

References

External links
 

English progressive rock groups
British soft rock music groups
Musical groups established in 1970
Warner Records artists
Island Records artists
CBS Records artists